Runs created (RC) is a baseball statistic invented by Bill James to estimate the number of runs a hitter contributes to their team.

Purpose
James explains in his book, The Bill James Historical Baseball Abstract, why he believes runs created is an essential thing to measure:With regard to an offensive player, the first key question is how many runs have resulted from what he has done with the bat and on the basepaths. Willie McCovey hit .270 in his career, with 353 doubles, 46 triples, 521 home runs and 1,345 walks -- but his job was not to hit doubles, nor to hit singles, nor to hit triples, nor to draw walks or even hit home runs, but rather to put runs on the scoreboard.  How many runs resulted from all of these things?

Runs created attempts to answer this bedrock question.  The conceptual framework of the "runs created" stat is:

where

A = On-base factor
B = Advancement factor
C = Opportunity factor

Formula

Basic runs created

In the most basic runs created formula:

where H is hits, BB is base on balls, TB is total bases and AB is at-bats.

This can also be expressed as

where OBP is on-base percentage, SLG is slugging average, AB is at-bats and TB is total bases, however it is worth noting that OBP includes the hit-by-pitch while the previous RC formula does not.

"Stolen base" version of runs created

This formula expands on the basic formula by accounting for a player's basestealing ability.

where H is hits, BB is base on balls, CS is caught stealing, TB is total bases, SB is stolen bases, and AB is at bats.

"Technical" version of runs created

This formula accounts for all basic, easily available offensive statistics.

where H is hits, BB is base on balls, CS is caught stealing, HBP is hit by pitch, GIDP is grounded into double play, TB is total bases, IBB is intentional base on balls, SH is sacrifice hit, SF is sacrifice fly, SB is stolen base, and AB is at bats.

2002 version of runs created

Earlier versions of runs created overestimated the number of runs created by players with extremely high A and B factors (on-base and slugging), such as Babe Ruth, Ted Williams and Barry Bonds.  This is because these formulas placed a player in an offensive context of players equal to himself; it is as if the player is assumed to be on base for himself when he hits home runs.  Of course, this is impossible, and in reality, a great player is interacting with offensive players whose contributions are inferior to his.  The 2002 version corrects this by placing the player in the context of his real-life team.  This 2002 version also takes into account performance in "clutch" situations.

A: 
B: 
C: 

where K is strikeout.

The initial individual runs created estimate is then:

If situational hitting information is available, the following should be added to the above total:

where RISP is runners in scoring position, BA is batting average, HR is home run, and ROB is runners on base. The subscripts indicate the required condition for the formula. For example,  means "hits while runners are in scoring position."

This is then figured for every member of the team, and an estimate of total team runs scored is added up.  The actual total of team runs scored is then divided by the estimated total team runs scored, yielding a ratio of real to estimated team runs scored.  The above individual runs created estimate is then multiplied by this ratio, to yield a runs created estimate for the individual.

Other expressions of runs created

Weighted runs created plus

Weighted runs created plus (wRC+) takes runs created and adjusts it to account for ballpark factors and the era a player played in.

Runs created as a rate stat
The same information provided by runs created can be expressed as a rate stat, rather than a raw number of runs contributed. This is usually expressed as runs created per some number of outs, e.g.  (27 being the number of outs per team in a standard 9-inning baseball game).

Accuracy

Runs created is believed to be an accurate measure of an individual's offensive contribution because when used on whole teams, the formula normally closely approximates how many runs the team actually scores.  Even the basic version of runs created usually predicts a team's run total within a 5% margin of error.  Other, more advanced versions are even more accurate.

Related statistics

 Win Shares is James' attempt to summarize, in one stat, a player's contributions on both offense and defense.

See also

 Sabermetrics
 Base Runs
 Extrapolated Runs
 Runs produced

References

External links
Career leaders in Runs Created
Single-season leaders in Runs Created
Runs Created leaders among active players
Year-by-year leaders in Runs Created

Batting statistics
Bill James